The 1954 NCAA baseball tournament was played at the end of the 1954 NCAA baseball season to determine the national champion of college baseball.  The tournament concluded with eight teams competing in the College World Series, a double-elimination tournament in its eighth year.  Eight regional districts sent representatives to the College World Series, but for the first time the preliminary tournament rounds hosted by each district were sanctioned NCAA events.  These events would later become known as regionals.  Each district had its own format for selecting teams, resulting in 24 teams participating in the tournament at the conclusion of their regular season, and in some cases, after a conference tournament.  The College World Series was held in Omaha, Nebraska from June 10 to June 16.  The eighth tournament's champion was Missouri, coached by John "Hi" Simmons.  The Most Outstanding Player was Tom Yewcic of Michigan State.

Tournament

District 1
Games played in Springfield, Massachusetts.

District 2
Games played at Allentown, Pennsylvania.

District 3
District 3 consisted of two separate 3-game series.  The first series was played between Virginia Tech and Clemson, with the winner moving on to play Rollins in a three-game series.  The winner of that series moved on to the College World Series.

In the semifinal series, the first game was played in Clemson, South Carolina, and the second game was played in Blacksburg, Virginia. Both final series games were played in Winter Park, Florida.

District 4
District 4 consisted of two separate 3 game series'.  The first series was played between Ohio and Ashland, with the winner moving on to play Michigan St. in a three-game series.  The winner of that series moved on to the College World Series.

Games played at Athens, Ohio.

District 5
Missouri (Automatic College World Series qualifier)

District 6
Games played at Austin, Texas.

District 7
Games played at Greeley, Colorado.

Arizona 8, Colorado State College 2

Colorado State College 21, Wyoming 14

Arizona 16, Wyoming 9

Arizona 8, Colorado State College 5 (11 inn.)

District 8
Games played at Eugene, Oregon.

College World Series

Participants

Results

Bracket

Game results

Notable players
 Arizona: Don Gile, Don Lee, Carl Thomas
 Lafayette: 
 UMass: 
 Michigan State: Bob Anderson, Ed Hobaugh, Jack Kralick, Leroy Powell, George Smith, Bill Stewart, Tom Yewcic
 Missouri: Jay Hankins, Jerry Schoonmaker, Norm Stewart
 Oklahoma A&M: Tom Borland
 Oregon: George Shaw
 Rollins:

References

Tournament
NCAA Division I Baseball Championship
NCAA baseball tournament
NCAA baseball tournament
NCAA baseball tournament
NCAA baseball tournament
NCAA baseball tournament
NCAA baseball tournament
NCAA baseball tournament
NCAA baseball tournament
NCAA baseball tournament
NCAA baseball tournament
NCAA baseball tournament
20th century in Springfield, Massachusetts
College baseball tournaments in Colorado
College baseball tournaments in Florida
College baseball tournaments in Massachusetts
College baseball tournaments in Michigan
College baseball tournaments in Nebraska
College baseball tournaments in Ohio
College baseball tournaments in Oregon
College baseball tournaments in Pennsylvania
College baseball tournaments in South Carolina
College baseball tournaments in Texas
College baseball tournaments in Virginia
Sports in Eugene, Oregon
Baseball competitions in Omaha, Nebraska
Sports competitions in Springfield, Massachusetts
Athens, Ohio
Blacksburg, Virginia
Sports competitions in Clemson, South Carolina
Sports competitions in East Lansing, Michigan
Greeley, Colorado
Winter Park, Florida